Georges Vitray (1888–1960) was a French film actor.

Biography 
Georges Victor Leporcher was born in Paris, France to Constant Leporcher and Victorine Victoire Bricier.  Georges took the name Vitray as a stage name.  Georges' mother was born in Bréal-sous-Vitré.

He participated in 46 French films ( with the exception of two co-productions with Germany and Italy in 1954 ) from 1931 to 1958 as well as a TV movie in 1959. He also played in the theater. He received the Knighthood of the Legion of Honour in 1959 for military service during World War I and 43 years of service to the Comédie-Française.  He was married to the American author and newspaper editor Laura Vitray (ne Yard). They had a son in 1924, George Alain Vitray.

Selected filmography
 Happy Hearts (1932)
 The Mysteries of Paris (1935)
 Forty Little Mothers (1936)
 The Tender Enemy (1936)
 Ultimatum (1938)
 Rasputin (1938)
 The Novel of Werther (1938)
 Mollenard (1938)
 Savage Brigade (1939)
 La Symphonie fantastique (1942)
 Star Without Light (1946)
 Devil and the Angel (1946)
 Mandrin (1947)
 The Secret of Monte Cristo (1948)
 Maya (1949)
 La Marie du port (1950)
 The Road to Damascus (1952)
 Their Last Night (1953)
 Flesh and the Woman (1954)
 A Double Life (1954)

References

Bibliography
 Crisp, C.G. The Classic French Cinema, 1930-1960. Indiana University Press, 1993.

External links

1888 births
1960 deaths
French male film actors
People from Paris
Chevaliers of the Légion d'honneur